The Road to The Nationals is a series of tournaments which serves as the prelude to the inaugural 2019 season of the eSports league in the Philippines known as "The Nationals". The winners will be part of a pool of players which the six pioneering teams of the league will draw players from.

Background

Launch and format
The Nationals eSports league was officially launched on July 24, 2018, in a press conference. In the same event, the "Road to The Nationals" a series of qualification tournament to determine the players of the six franchise teams to compete in The Nationals' inaugural season was announced. Three qualifiers for each of The Nationals three video game titles will be held. These tournaments will run from August to October 2018 with the qualifying eight teams from each of the three titles competing in the final qualification tournament at the Electronic Sports and Gaming Summit 2018 to be held from October 27 to 28 at the SMX Convention Center in Pasay.

The winning teams will be given millions of pesos in prize money and a chance to get drafted in one of the six franchise teams of The Nationals.

Video game titles
Three titles, belonging to three categories: PC gaming, Mobile gaming, Console gaming, will be contested in The Nationals. On July 24, 2018, two titles for The Nationals were confirmed: Dota 2 for PC Gaming and Mobile Legends: Bang Bang for Mobile gaming. As of that date, two titles are being considered for the Console gaming category: NBA 2K19 and Tekken 7. NBA 2K19 was confirmed as the third title by August 2018. but this decision was retracted and Tekken 7 was made the third title in September 2018. The Road to The Nationals will feature these three titles.

Qualification tournaments

Dota 2
Elimination tournaments for Dota 2 will be held from August 4 to October 13, 2018.

Mobile Legends: Bang Bang
The Road to The Nationals integrates the Mobile Legends: Bang Bang Professional League Season 2 tournament for the elimination phase of Mobile Legends: Bang Bang.

Tekken 7
Elimination tournaments for Tekken 7 was scheduled be held from August 4 to October 13, 2018. Originally the schedule was meant for elimination tournaments for NBA 2K19 before the basketball video game title was replaced by the arcade fighting game.

Final tournament
The final tournament will be held in conjunction with the Electronic Sports and Gaming Summit 2018 from October 27 to 28 at the SMX Convention Center in Pasay. Matches will be broadcast live on AksyonTV.

Dota 2
Eight teams qualified for the final tournament. The final best-of-five series was contested between the Sterling Global Dragons and the Station 751. The former team won 3–1 over the latter.

Tekken 7
Eight players qualified for the final tournament. Alexandre Lavarez (PBE|AK) and Andreij Albar (PBE|Doujin) contested in the final match with the latter winning over the former.

Notes

References

2018 fighting game tournaments
2018 in Philippine sport
2018 multiplayer online battle arena tournaments
Esports competitions in the Philippines
The Nationals (esports)